Apostolic succession is the method whereby the ministry of the Christian Church is held to be derived from the apostles by a continuous succession, which has usually been associated with a claim that the succession is through a series of bishops. Those of the Anglican, Church of the East, Eastern Orthodox, Hussite, Moravian, Old Catholic, Oriental Orthodox, Catholic and Scandinavian Lutheran traditions maintain that "a bishop cannot have regular or valid orders unless he has been consecrated in this apostolic succession". These traditions do not always consider the episcopal consecrations of all of the other traditions as valid.

This series was seen originally as that of the bishops of a particular see founded by one or more of the apostles. According to historian Justo L. González, apostolic succession is generally understood today as meaning a series of bishops, regardless of see, each consecrated by other bishops, themselves consecrated similarly in a succession going back to the apostles. According to the Joint International Commission for Theological Dialogue Between the Catholic Church and the Orthodox Church, "apostolic succession" means more than a mere transmission of powers. It is succession in a church which witnesses to the apostolic faith, in communion with the other churches, witnesses of the same apostolic faith. The "see (cathedra) plays an important role in inserting the bishop into the heart of ecclesial apostolicity", but, once ordained, the bishop becomes in his church the guarantor of apostolicity and becomes a successor of the apostles.

Those who hold for the importance of apostolic succession via episcopal laying on of hands appeal to the New Testament, which, they say, implies a personal apostolic succession (from Paul to Timothy and Titus, for example). They appeal as well to other documents of the early Church, especially the Epistle of Clement. In this context, Clement explicitly states that the apostles appointed bishops as successors and directed that these bishops should in turn appoint their own successors; given this, such leaders of the Church were not to be removed without cause and not in this way. Further, proponents of the necessity of the personal apostolic succession of bishops within the Church point to the universal practice of the undivided early Church (up to AD 431), before it was divided into the Church of the East, Oriental Orthodoxy, the Eastern Orthodox Church and the Roman Catholic Church.

Some Protestants deny the need for this type of continuity, and the historical claims involved have been severely questioned by them; Anglican academic Eric G. Jay comments that the account given of the emergence of the episcopate in Chapter III of the dogmatic constitution Lumen gentium (1964) "is very sketchy, and many ambiguities in the early history of the Christian ministry are passed over".

Various meanings 
Michael Ramsey, an English Anglican bishop and the Archbishop of Canterbury (1961–1974), described three meanings of "apostolic succession":
 One bishop succeeding another in the same see meant that there was a continuity of teaching: "while the Church as a whole is the vessel into which the truth is poured, the Bishops are an important organ in carrying out this task".
 The bishops were also successors of the apostles in that "the  they performed of preaching, governing and ordaining were the same as the Apostles had performed".
 It is also used to signify that "grace is transmitted from the Apostles by each generation of bishops through the imposition of hands".
He adds that this last has been controversial in that it has been claimed that this aspect of the doctrine is not found before the time of Augustine of Hippo, while others allege that it is implicit in the Church of the second and third centuries.

In its 1982 statement on Baptism, Eucharist and Ministry, the Faith and Order Commission of the World Council of Churches stated that "the primary manifestation of apostolic succession is to be found in the apostolic tradition of the Church as a whole. ... Under the particular historical circumstances of the growing Church in the early centuries, the succession of bishops became one of the ways, together with the transmission of the Gospel and the life of the community, in which the apostolic tradition of the Church was expressed." It spoke of episcopal succession as something that churches that do not have bishops can see "as a sign, though not a guarantee, of the continuity and unity of the Church" and that all churches can see "as a sign of the apostolicity of the life of the whole church".

The Porvoo Common Statement (1996), agreed to by the Anglican churches of the British Isles and most of the Lutheran churches of Scandinavia and the Baltic, echoed the Munich (1982) and Finland (1988) statements of the Joint International Commission for Theological Dialogue between the Roman Catholic Church and the Orthodox Church by stating that "the continuity signified in the consecration of a bishop to episcopal ministry cannot be divorced from the continuity of life and witness of the diocese to which he is called."

Some Anglicans, in addition to other Protestants, held that apostolic succession "may also be understood as a continuity in doctrinal teaching from the time of the apostles to the present". For example, the British Methodist Conference locates the "true continuity" with the Church of past ages in "the continuity of Christian experience, the fellowship in the gift of the one Spirit; in the continuity in the allegiance to one Lord, the continued proclamation of the message; the continued acceptance of the mission".

The teaching of the Second Vatican Council on apostolic succession has been summed up as follows:

In the early Fathers
According to International Theological Commission (ITC), conflicts could not always be avoided between individuals among the New Testament communities; Paul appealed to his apostolic authority when there was a disagreement about the Gospel or principles of Christian life. How the development of apostolic government proceeded is difficult to say accurately because of the paucity of relevant documents. ITC says that the apostles or their closest assistants or their successors directed the local colleges of episkopoi and presbyteroi by the end of the first century; while by the beginning of the second century the figure of a single bishop, as the head of the communities, appears explicitly in the letters of Ignatius of Antioch ( 35-107). In the Epistle to the Smyrnaeans, Ignatius wrote about three degrees ministry:

Ramsey says that the doctrine was formulated in the second century in the first of the three senses given by him, originally as a response to Gnostic claims of having received secret teaching from Christ or the apostles; it emphasised the public manner in which the apostles had passed on authentic teaching to those whom they entrusted with the care of the churches they founded and that these in turn had passed it on to their successors. Ramsey argues that only later was it given a different meaning, a process in which Augustine (Bishop of Hippo Regis, 395–430) played a part by emphasising the idea of "the link from consecrator to consecrated whereby the grace of order was handed on".

Writing in about AD 94, Clement of Rome states that the apostles appointed successors to continue their work where they had planted churches and for these in their turn to do the same because they foresaw the risk of discord: "Our Apostles, too, by the instruction of our Lord Jesus Christ, knew that strife would arise concerning the dignity of a bishop; and on this account, having received perfect foreknowledge, they appointed the above-mentioned as bishops and deacons: and then gave a rule of succession, in order that, when they had fallen asleep, other men, who had been approved, might succeed to their ministry." According to Anglican Eric G. Jay, the interpretation of his writing is disputed, but it is clear that he supports some sort of approved continuation of the ministry exercised by the apostles which in its turn was derived from Christ.

Hegesippus (180?) and Irenaeus (180) introduce explicitly the idea of the bishop's succession in office as a guarantee of the truth of what he preached in that it could be traced back to the apostles, and they produced succession lists to back this up. That this succession depended on the fact of ordination to a vacant see and the status of those who administered the ordination is seldom commented on. Woollcombe also states that no one questioned the apostolicity of the See of Alexandria despite the fact that its Popes were consecrated by the college of presbyters up till the time of the Council of Nicaea in 325. On the contrary, other sources clearly state that Mark the Evangelist is the first bishop of Alexandria (Pope of Alexandria), then he ordained Annianus as his successor bishop (2nd Pope) as told by Eusebius.

James F. Puglisi, director of Centro Pro Unione, made a conclusion about Irenaeus' writings: "the terms episkopos and presbyteros are interchangeable, but the term episkopos [bishop] is applied to the person who is established in every Church by the apostles and their successors". According to Eric G. Jay, Irenaeus also refers to a succession of presbyters who preserve the tradition "which originates from the apostles". and later goes on to speak of their having "an infallible gift of truth" [charisma veritatis certum]. Jay comments that this is sometimes seen as an early reference to the idea of the transmission of grace through the apostolic succession which in later centuries was understood as being specifically transmitted through the laying on of hands by a bishop within the apostolic succession (the "pipeline theory"). He warns that this is open to the grave objection that it makes grace a (quasi)material commodity and represents an almost mechanical method of imparting what is by definition a free gift. He adds that the idea cannot be squeezed out of Irenaeus' words.

Writing a little later, Tertullian makes the same main point but adds expressly that recently founded churches (such as his own in Carthage) could be considered apostolic if they had "derived the tradition of faith and the seeds of doctrine" from an apostolic church. His disciple, Cyprian (Bishop of Carthage 248–58) appeals to the same fundamental principle of election to a vacant see in the aftermath of the Decian Persecution when denying the legitimacy of his rigorist rival in Carthage and that of the anti-pope Novatian in Rome. The emphasis is now on legitimating Cyprian's episcopal ministry as a whole and specifically his exclusive right to administer discipline to the lapsed rather than on the content of what is taught. Cyprian also laid great emphasis on the fact that any minister who broke with the Church lost ipso facto the gift of the Spirit which had validated his orders. This meant that the minister would have no power or authority to celebrate an efficacious sacrament.

As transmission of grace
For the adherents of this understanding of apostolic succession, grace is transmitted during episcopal consecrations (the ordination of bishops) by the laying on of hands of bishops previously consecrated within the apostolic succession. They hold that this lineage of ordination derives from the Twelve Apostles, thus making the Church the continuation of the early Apostolic Christian community. They see it as one of four elements that define the true Church of Jesus Christ, and legitimize the ministry of its clergy, since only a bishop within the succession can perform valid ordinations and only bishops and presbyters (priests) ordained by bishops in the apostolic succession can validly celebrate (or "confect") several of the other sacraments, including the Eucharist, reconciliation of penitents, confirmation and anointing of the sick. Everett Ferguson argued that Hippolytus, in Apostolic Tradition 9, is the first known source to state that only bishops have the authority to ordain; and normally at least three bishops were required to ordain another bishop. Cyprian also asserts that "if any one is not with the bishop, he is not in the church".

This position was stated by John Henry Newman, before his conversion from Anglicanism to Roman Catholicism, in Tracts for the Times:
We [priests of the Church of England] have been born, not of blood, nor of the will of the flesh, nor of the will of man, but of God. The Lord Jesus Christ gave His Spirit to His Apostles; they in turn laid their hands on those who should succeed them; and these again on others; and so the sacred gift has been handed down to our present bishops, who have appointed us as their assistants, and in some sense representatives. ... we must necessarily consider none to be  ordained who have not  been ordained.

Ferguson, in Encyclopedia of Early Christianity, says that example of James and the elders (presbyters) of the Jerusalem Church (Acts 21:18) may have provided a model for the development of 'monepiscopacy', in which James' position has figured conspicuously in modern theories about the rise of the monepiscopacy. Raymond E. Brown says that in the earlier stage (before the third century and perhaps earlier) there were plural bishops or overseers ("presbyter-bishops") in an individual community; in the later stage changed to only one bishop per community. Little is known about how the early bishops were formally chosen or appointed; afterwards the Church developed a regularized pattern of selection and ordination of bishops, and from the third century on that was universally applied. Brown asserts that the ministry was not ordained by the Church to act on its own authority, but as an important part to continue the ministry of Jesus Christ and helps to make the Church what it is.

Raymond E. Brown also states that by the early second century, as written in the letters of Ignatius of Antioch, in the threefold structure of the single bishop, plural presbyters, and plural deacons, the celebration of the Eucharist is assigned to the bishop alone; the bishop may delegate others when he goes away. At the Last Supper, Jesus says to those present, who were or included the Twelve Apostles, "Do this in remembrance of me," Brown presumes that the Twelve were remembered as presiding at the Eucharist. But they could scarcely have been present at all the Eucharists of the first century, and no information in New Testament whether a person was regularly assigned to do this task and, if so, who that person was. After all the Church regulated and regularized the celebration of the Eucharist, as that was an inevitable establishment if communities were to be provided regularly with the 'bread of life', since it could not rely on gratuitous provision.

Objections to the transmission of grace theory
According to William Griffith Thomas, some Protestants have objected that this theory is not explicitly found in Scripture, and the New Testament uses 'bishop' and 'presbyter' as alternative names for the same office. Michael Ramsey argued it is not clearly found in the writings of the Fathers before Augustine in the fourth century and there were attempts to read it back as implicit in earlier writers.

For example, C. K. Barrett points out that the Pastoral Epistles are concerned that ministers of the generation of Timothy and Titus should pass on the doctrine they had received to the third generation. According to Barrett, teaching and preaching are "the main, almost the only, activities of ministry". He argues that in Clement of Rome ministerial activity is liturgical: the undifferentiated 'presbyter-bishops' are to "make offerings to the Lord at the right time and in the right places" something which is simply not defined by the evangelists. He also mentions the change in the use of sacrificial language as a more significant still: for Paul the Eucharist is a receiving of gifts from God, the Christian sacrifice is the offering of one's body. Moving on to Ignatius of Antioch, Barrett states that a sharp distinction is found between 'presbyter' and 'bishop': the latter now stands out as "an isolated figure" who is to be obeyed and without whom it is not lawful to baptise or hold a love-feast. He also points out that when Ignatius writes to the Romans, there is no mention of a bishop of the Roman Church, "which we may suppose had not yet adopted the monarchical episcopate". Jalland comes to a similar conclusion and locates the change from the "polyepiscopacy" of the house church model in Rome, to monepiscopacy as occurring before the middle of the second century.

Similar objections are voiced by Harvey who comments that there is a "strong and ancient tradition" that the presence of an ordained man is necessary for the celebration of the Eucharist. But, according to him, there is "certainly no evidence for this view in the New Testament" and in the case of Clement of Rome and Ignatius of Antioch the implication is not that it  be celebrated by anyone else, but that it  not. Harvey says in the third century this "concern for propriety" begins to be displaced by the concept of 'power' to do so which means that in the absence of such a man it is "literally impossible" for a Eucharist to be celebrated.

Apostolicity as doctrinal and related continuity
Some Protestant denominations, not including Scandinavian Lutherans, Anglicans and Moravians, deny the need of maintaining episcopal continuity with the early Church, holding that the role of the apostles was that, having been chosen directly by Jesus as witnesses of his resurrection, they were to be the "special instruments of the Holy Spirit in founding and building up the Church". Anglican theologian E. A. Litton argues that the Church is "built upon 'the foundation of the Prophets and Apostles', but a foundation does not repeat itself"; therefore he says that when the apostles died, they were replaced by their writings. To share with the apostles the same faith, to believe their word as found in the Scriptures, to receive the same Holy Spirit, is to many Protestants the only meaningful "continuity". The most meaningful apostolic succession for them, then, is a "faithful succession" of apostolic teaching.

Max Thurian, before his conversion to Roman Catholicism in 1988, described the classic Reformed/Presbyterian concept of apostolic succession in the following terms. "The Christian ministry is not derived from the people but from the pastors; a scriptural ordinance provides for this ministry being renewed by the ordination of a presbyter by presbyters; this ordinance originates with the apostles, who were themselves presbyters, and through them it goes back to Christ as its source.". Then he continued:
"it does not guarantee the continuity and faithfulness of the Church. A purely historical or mechanical succession of ministers, bishops or pastors would not mean ipso facto true apostolic succession in the church, Reformed tradition, following authentic Catholic tradition, distinguishes four realities which make up the true apostolic succession, symbolized, but not absolutely guaranteed, by ministerial succession." At the same time Thurian argued that the realities form a "composite faithfulness" and are (i) "perseverance in the apostolic doctrine"; (ii) "the will to proclaim God's word"; (iii) "communion in the fundamental continuity of the Church, the Body of Christ, the faithful celebration of Baptism and the Eucharist"; (iv) "succession in the laying on of hands, the sign of ministerial continuity".

According to Walter Kasper, the Reformed-Catholic dialogue came to belief that there is an apostolic succession which is important to the life of the Church, though both sides distinguish the meaning of that succession. Besides, the dialogue states that apostolic succession "consists at least in continuity of apostolic doctrine, but this is not in opposition to succession through continuity of ordained ministry". While the Lutheran-Catholic dialogue distinguished between apostolic succession in faith (in substantive meaning) and apostolic succession as ministerial succession of bishops, it agreed that "succession in the sense of the succession of ministers must be seen within the succession of the whole church in the apostolic faith".

The Joint International Commission for Theological Dialogue Between the Catholic Church and the Orthodox Church asserts that apostolic succession means something more than just a transmission of authorities; it witnesses to the apostolic faith from the same apostolic faith, and in communion with other churches (attached to the apostolic communion). Apostolic tradition deals with the community, not only an ordained bishop as an isolated person. Since the bishop, once ordained, becomes the guarantor of apostolicity and successor of the apostles; he joins together all the bishops, thus maintaining episkope of the local churches derived from the college of the apostles.

Churches claiming apostolic succession

Churches that claim some form of episcopal apostolic succession, dating back to the apostles or to leaders from the apostolic era, include:
 the Roman Catholic Church
 the Eastern Orthodox Church
 the Oriental Orthodox Churches
 the Church of the East
 the Anglican Communion
 some Lutheran churches 
 Old Catholics and other Independent Catholics (those incorporating the term "Catholic")
 some churches in the Convergence Movement

The Anglican Communion  and those Lutheran churches which claim apostolic succession do not specifically teach this but exclusively practice episcopal ordination. While some Anglicans claim it for their communion, their views are often nuanced and there is widespread reluctance to 'unchurch' Christian bodies which lack it.

Roman Catholics recognize the validity of the apostolic successions of the bishops, and therefore the rest of the clergy, of the Eastern Orthodox, Oriental Orthodox, Church of the East, and Polish National Catholic Church. The Orthodox generally recognize Roman Catholic clerical orders as being of apostolic lineage, but have a different concept of the apostolic succession as it exists outside the canonical borders of the Eastern Orthodox Church, extending the term only to bishops who have maintained communion, received ordination from a line of apostolic bishops, and preserved the catholic faith once delivered through the apostles and handed down as Holy Tradition. The lack of apostolic succession through bishops is the primary basis on which Protestant denominations (barring some like Anglicans and Old Catholics) are not called churches, in the proper sense, by the Orthodox and Roman Catholic churches, the latter referring to them as "ecclesial communities" in the official documents of the Second Vatican Council.

The Church of Jesus Christ of Latter-day Saints also claims apostolic succession. According to Latter-day Saint tradition, in 1829, Joseph Smith received the priesthood from a visit from heaven of Jesus' disciples Peter, James, and John. After its establishment, each subsequent prophet and leader of the church have received the authority passed down by the laying on of hands, or through apostolic succession. Orthodox, Roman Catholic, and Protestant Christians reject the claim that Smith possessed direct or indirect apostolic authority.

Apostolic founders

An early understanding of apostolic succession is represented by the traditional beliefs of various churches, as organised around important episcopal sees, to have been founded by specific apostles. On the basis of these traditions, the churches hold they have inherited specific authority, doctrines or practices on the authority of their founding apostle(s), which is understood to be continued by the bishops of the apostolic throne of the church that each founded and whose original leader he was. Thus:
 The See of Rome, the head see of the Catholic Church, states that it was founded by Simon Peter (traditionally called "Prince of the Apostles" and "Chief of the Apostles") and Paul the Apostle. Although Peter also founded the See of Antioch, the See of Rome claims the full authority of Peter (who, according to Catholic doctrine, was the visible head of the church and the sole chief of the Apostles) exclusively for itself, because Peter died as the Bishop of Rome, and not of another see.
 The Ecumenical Patriarchate of Constantinople, the primary patriarchate of the Eastern Orthodox Church, states that Apostle Andrew (elder brother of Simon Peter) was its founder.
 Each Patriarchate of Alexandria (the Greek Orthodox Church of Alexandria, the Coptic Catholic Church, and the Coptic Orthodox Church) states that it was founded by Mark the Evangelist.
 Each Patriarchate of Antioch (the Greek Orthodox Church of Antioch, the Syriac Orthodox Church, the Maronite Church, the Melkite Greek Catholic Church, and the Syriac Catholic Church) states that it was founded by Simon Peter.
 The Eastern Orthodox Patriarchate of Jerusalem states that it was founded by James the Just.
 Each Armenian Church (the Armenian Apostolic Church, based at Etchmiadzin, and the Armenian Catholic Church, whose patriarchal see is Cilicia but is based at Beirut) states that it was founded by the Apostles Bartholomew and Jude Thaddeus.
 The following bodies state they were founded by the Apostle Thomas: the Assyrian Church of the East, the Ancient Church of the East and the Chaldean Catholic Church, originating in or around Mesopotamia, and churches based in Kerala, India having Syriac roots and generically known as the Saint Thomas Christians: the Syro-Malabar Catholic Church, the Syro-Malankara Catholic Church, the Jacobite Syrian Christian Church, the Malankara Orthodox Syrian Church, and the Mar Thoma Syrian Church.
 The Orthodox Tewahedo churches (the Ethiopian Orthodox Tewahedo Church and the Eritrean Orthodox Tewahedo Church) state that they were founded by Philip the Evangelist and Mark the Evangelist.
 The Orthodox Church of Georgia states that the Apostles Andrew and Simon the Zealot were its founders.
 The Orthodox Church of Cyprus, based at Nova Justiniana (Erdek), states that it was founded by the Apostles Paul and Barnabas.
The Bulgarian Orthodox Church states that it has a connection with Andrew the Apostle.
 The Russian Orthodox Church states that it has a connection with the Apostle Andrew, who is said to have visited the area where the city of Kyiv later arose.

Teachings
Teachings on the nature of Apostolic Succession vary depending on the ecclesiastic body, especially within various Protestant denominations. Christians of the Church of the East, Oriental Orthodox, Eastern Orthodox Church and the Roman Catholic Church teach apostolic succession. Among the previously mentioned churches opinions vary as to the validity of succession within Old Catholic, Anglican, Moravian, and Lutheran communities.

Roman Catholic Church

In Catholic theology, the doctrine of apostolic succession is that the apostolic tradition – including apostolic teaching, preaching, and authority – is handed down from the college of apostles to the college of bishops through the laying on of hands, as a permanent office in the Church. Historically, this has been understood as a succession in office, a succession of valid ordinations, or a succession of the entire college. It is understood as a sign and guarantee that the Church, both local and universal, is in diachronic continuity with the apostles; a necessary but insufficient guarantor thereof.

Papal primacy is different though related to apostolic succession as described here. The Roman Catholic Church has traditionally claimed a unique leadership role for the Apostle Peter, believed to have been named by Jesus as head of the Apostles and as a focus of their unity, who became the first Bishop of Rome, and whose successors inherited the role and accordingly became the leaders of the worldwide Church as well. Even so, Roman Catholicism acknowledges the papacy is built on apostolic succession, not the other way around. As such, apostolic succession is a foundational doctrine of authority in the Catholic Church. Peter was succeeded by Linus, Linus by Clement, Clement by Anacletus, Anacletus by Evaristus..."The Roman Catholic position is summarised this way: "The Lord says to Peter: 'I say to you,’ he says, 'that you are Peter, and upon this rock I will build my Church, and the gates of hell will not overcome it ....’ On him [Peter] he builds the Church, and to him he gives the command to feed the sheep, and although he assigns a like power to all the apostles, yet he founded a single chair [cathedra], and he established by his own authority a source and an intrinsic reason for that unity.... If someone [today] does not hold fast to this unity of Peter, can he imagine that he still holds the faith? If he [should] desert the chair of Peter upon whom the Church was built, can he still be confident that he is in the Church?"

Roman Catholicism holds that Christ entrusted the Apostles with the leadership of the community of believers, and the obligation to transmit and preserve the "deposit of faith" (the experience of Christ and his teachings contained in the doctrinal "tradition" handed down from the time of the apostles and the written portion, which is Scripture). The apostles then passed on this office and authority by ordaining bishops to follow after them.

Roman Catholic theology holds that the apostolic succession effects the power and authority to administer the sacraments except for baptism and matrimony. (Baptism may be administered by anyone and matrimony by the couple to each other.) Authority to so administer such sacraments is passed on only through the sacrament of Holy Orders, a rite by which a priest is ordained (ordination can be conferred only by bishop). The bishop, of course, must be from an unbroken line of bishops stemming from the original apostles selected by Jesus Christ. Thus, apostolic succession is necessary for the valid celebration of the sacraments.

Views concerning other churches

In the Roman Catholic Church, Pope Leo XIII stated in his 1896 bull Apostolicae curae that the Catholic Church believes specifically that Anglican orders were to be considered "absolutely null and utterly void".

His argument was as follows. First, the ordination rite of Edward VI had removed the language of a sacrificial priesthood. Ordinations using this new rite occurred for over a century and, because the restoration of the language of "priesthood" a century later in the ordination rite "was introduced too late, as a century had already elapsed since the adoption of the Edwardine Ordinal ... the Hierarchy had become extinct, there remained no power of ordaining." With this extinction of validly ordained bishops in England, "the true Sacrament of Order as instituted by Christ lapsed, and with it the hierarchical succession." As a result, the pope's final judgment was that Anglican ordinations going forward were to be considered "absolutely null and utterly void". Anglican clergy were from then on to be ordained as Roman Catholic priests upon entry into the Catholic Church.

A reply from the Archbishops of Canterbury and York (1896) was issued to counter Pope Leo's arguments: Saepius officio: Answer of the Archbishops of Canterbury and York to the Bull Apostolicae Curae of H. H. Leo XIII. They argued that if the Anglican orders were invalid, then the Roman orders were as well since the Pope based his case on the fact that the Anglican ordinals used did not contain certain essential elements but these were not found in the early Roman rites either. Catholics argue, this argument does not consider the sacramental intention involved in validating Holy Orders. In other words, Roman Catholics believe that the ordination rites were reworded so as to invalidate the ordinations because the intention behind the alterations in the rite was a fundamental change in Anglican understanding of the priesthood.

It is Roman Catholic doctrine that the teaching of Apostolicae curae is a truth to be "held definitively, but are not able to be declared as divinely revealed," as stated in a commentary by the Congregation for the Doctrine of the Faith. Cardinal Basil Hume explained the conditional character of his ordination of Graham Leonard, former Anglican bishop of the Diocese of London, to the priesthood in the following way: "While firmly restating the judgement of Apostolicae Curae that Anglican ordination is invalid, the Roman Catholic Church takes account of the involvement, in some Anglican episcopal ordinations, of bishops of the Old Catholic Church of the Union of Utrecht who are validly ordained. In particular and probably rare cases the authorities in Rome may judge that there is a 'prudent doubt' concerning the invalidity of priestly ordination received by an individual Anglican minister ordained in this line of succession." At the same time, he stated: "Since the church must be in no doubt of the validity of the sacraments celebrated for the Roman Catholic community, it must ask all who are chosen to exercise the priesthood in the Catholic Church to accept sacramental ordination in order to fulfill their ministry and be integrated into the apostolic succession." Since Apostolicae curae was issued many Anglican jurisdictions have revised their ordinals, bringing them more in line with ordinals of the early Church.

Timothy Dufort, writing in The Tablet in 1982, attempted to present an ecumenical solution to the problem of how the Roman Catholic Church might accept Anglican orders without needing to formally repudiate Apostolicae curae at all. Dufort argued that by 1969 all Anglican bishops had acquired apostolic succession fully recognized by Rome, since from the 1930s Old Catholic bishops (the validity of whose orders the Vatican has never questioned) have acted as co-consecrators in the ordination of Anglican bishops. This view has not yet been considered formally by the Holy See, but after Anglican Bishop Graham Leonard converted to Roman Catholicism, he was only reordained in 1994  because of the presence of Old Catholic bishops at his ordination.

The question of the validity of Anglican orders has been further complicated by the Anglican ordination of women. In a document it published in July 1998, the Congregation for the Doctrine of the Faith stated that the Catholic Church's declaration on the invalidity of Anglican ordinations is a teaching that the church has definitively propounded and that therefore every Roman Catholic is required to give "firm and definitive assent" to this matter. This being said, in May 2017, Cardinal Francesco Coccopalmerio, President of the Pontifical Council for Legislative Texts, has asked whether the current Roman Catholic position on invalidity could be revised in the future.

Eastern Orthodox

While Eastern Orthodox sources often refer to the bishops as "successors of the apostles" under the influence of Scholastic theology, strict Orthodox ecclesiology and theology hold that all legitimate bishops are properly successors of Peter. This also means that presbyters (or "priests") are successors of the apostles. As a result, Eastern Orthodox theology makes a distinction between a geographical or historical succession and proper ontological or ecclesiological succession. Hence, the bishops of Rome and Antioch can be considered successors of Peter in a historical sense on account of Peter's presence in the early community. This does not imply that these bishops are more successors of Peter than all others in an ontological sense.

The Eastern Orthodox have often permitted non-Eastern Orthodox clergy to be rapidly ordained within Orthodoxy as a matter of pastoral necessity and economia. Priests entering Eastern Orthodoxy from Oriental Orthodoxy and Roman Catholicism have usually been received by "vesting" and have been allowed to function immediately within Eastern Orthodoxy as priests. Recognition of Roman Catholic orders by the Russian Orthodox Church was stipulated in 1667 by the Synod of Moscow, but this position is not universal within the Eastern Orthodox communion. For example, Fr. John Morris of the Antiochian Orthodox Christian Archdiocese of North America, states that "Apostolic Succession is not merely a historical pedigree, but also requires Apostolic Faith. This is because Apostolic Succession is not the private possession of a bishop, but is the attribute of a local Church. A bishop who goes in schism or is cast out of office due to heresy does not take his Apostolic Succession with him as a private possession." The validity of a priest's ordination is decided by each autocephalous Eastern Orthodox church.

In 1922 the Eastern Orthodox Ecumenical Patriarch of Constantinople recognised Anglican orders as valid, holding that they carry "the same validity as the Roman, Old Catholic and Armenian churches possess". In the encyclical "From the Oecumenical Patriarch to the Presidents of the Particular Eastern Orthodox churches", Meletius IV of Constantinople, the Oecumenical Patriarch, wrote: "That the Orthodox theologians who have scientifically examined the question have almost unanimously come to the same conclusions and have declared themselves as accepting the validity of Anglican Orders." Following this declaration, in 1923, the Eastern Orthodox Patriarchate of Jerusalem, as well as the Eastern Orthodox Church of Cyprus agreed by "provisionally acceding that Anglican priests should not be re-ordained if they became Orthodox"; in 1936, the Romanian Orthodox Church "endorsed Anglican Orders".

Succeeding judgements have been more conflicting. The Eastern Orthodox churches require a totality of common teaching to recognise orders and in this broader view find ambiguities in Anglican teaching and practice problematic. Accordingly, in some parts of the Eastern Orthodox Church, Anglican clergy who convert to Orthodoxy are reordained, rather than vested.

Oriental Orthodox Churches 
The Armenian Apostolic Church, which is one of the Oriental Orthodox churches, recognises Roman Catholic episcopal consecrations without qualification.

Anglican Communion

The Anglican Communion "has never officially endorsed any one particular theory of the origin of the historic episcopate, its exact relation to the apostolate, and the sense in which it should be thought of as God given, and in fact tolerates a wide variety of views on these points". Its claim to apostolic succession is rooted in the Church of England's evolution as part of the Western Church. Apostolic succession is viewed not so much as conveyed mechanically through an unbroken chain of the laying-on of hands, but as expressing continuity with the unbroken chain of commitment, beliefs and mission starting with the first apostles; and as hence emphasising the enduring yet evolving nature of the Church.

When Henry VIII broke away from the jurisdiction of Rome in 1533/4, the English Church claimed the episcopal polity and apostolic succession inherent in its Roman Catholic past. Reformed theology gained a certain foothold, and under his successor, Edward VI what had been an administrative schism – as the Church under Henry was separated from Rome but remained essentially Roman Catholic in its theology and practice – became a  reformation under the guiding hand of Thomas Cranmer. Although care was taken to maintain the unbroken sequence of episcopal consecrations – particularly in the case of Matthew Parker, who was consecrated Archbishop of Canterbury in 1559 by two bishops who had been ordained in the 1530s with the Roman Pontifical and two ordained with the Edwardine Ordinal of 1550 – apostolic succession was not seen as a major concern that a true ministry could not exist without episcopal consecrations: English Reformers such as Richard Hooker rejected the Roman position that Apostolic Succession is divinely commanded or necessary for true Christian ministry. American Episcopal theologian Richard A. Norris argues that the "foreign Reformed [Presbyterian] churches" were genuine ones despite the lack of apostolic succession because they had been abandoned by their bishops at the Reformation. In very different ways both James II and William III of England made it plain that the Church of England could no longer count on the 'godly prince' to maintain its identity and traditions and the 'High Church' clergy of the time began to look to the idea of apostolic succession as a basis for the church's life. For William Beveridge (Bishop of St Asaph, 1704–8) the importance of this lay in the fact that Christ himself is "continually present at such imposition of hands; thereby transferring the same Spirit, which He had first breathed into His Apostles, upon others successively after them", but the doctrine did not really come to the fore until the time of the Tractarians.

In 1833, before his conversion to Roman Catholicism, Newman wrote about the apostolic succession: "We must necessarily consider none to be  ordained who has not been  ordained". After quoting this, Michael Ramsey continues: "With romantic enthusiasm, the Tractarians propagated this doctrine. In doing so they involved themselves in some misunderstandings of history and in some confusion of theology". He goes on to explain that they ascribed to early Anglican authors a far more exclusive version of the doctrine than was the case, they blurred the distinction between succession in office (Irenaeus) and succession in consecration (Augustine); they spoke of apostolic succession as the channel of grace in a way that failed to do justice to His gracious activity within all the dispensations of the New Covenant. J. B. Lightfoot argued that monarchial episcopacy evolved upwards from a college of presbyters by the elevation of one of their number to be the episcopal president and A.C. Headlam laid great stress on Irenaeus' understanding of succession which had been lost from sight behind the Augustinian 'pipe-line theory'.

Lutheran churches

Wide variations exist within Lutheranism on this issue. Most Lutheran churches in Scandinavian countries are favorable to the traditional doctrine of apostolic succession. Others de-emphasize it, e.g., many German Lutheran churches in former Prussian lands, resulting from their state-ordered union with Reformed (Calvinist) churches in 1817.

Lutheran claims to apostolic succession 

In Scandinavia and the Baltic region, Lutheran churches participating in the Porvoo Communion (those of Iceland, Norway, Sweden, Finland, Estonia, and Lithuania), as well as non-Porvoo membership Lutheran churches in the region (including those of Latvia, and Russia), and the confessional Communion of Nordic Lutheran Dioceses, believe that they ordain their bishops in apostolic succession in lines stemming from the original apostles. The New Westminster Dictionary of Church History states that "In Sweden the apostolic succession was preserved because the Catholic bishops were allowed to stay in office, but they had to approve changes in the ceremonies."

The Lutheran Church of Finland was at that time one with the Church of Sweden and so holds the same view regarding the see of Åbo/Turku.

In 2001, Francis Aloysius Sullivan wrote: "To my knowledge, the Catholic Church has never officially expressed its judgement on the validity of orders as they have been handed down by episcopal succession in these two national Lutheran churches." In 2007, the Holy See declared: "Christian Communities born out of the Reformation of the sixteenth century [...] do not enjoy apostolic succession in the sacrament of Orders, and are, therefore, deprived of a constitutive element of the Church." This statement speaks of the Protestant movement as a whole, not specifically of the Lutheran churches in Sweden and Finland. The 2010 report from the Roman Catholic – Lutheran Dialogue Group for Sweden and Finland, Justification in the Life of the Church, states: "The Evangelical-Lutheran churches in Sweden and Finland [...] believe that they are part of an unbroken apostolic chain of succession. The Catholic Church does however question how the ecclesiastical break in the 16th century has affected the apostolicity of the churches of the Reformation and thus the apostolicity of their ministry." Emil Anton interprets this report as saying that the Roman Catholic Church does not deny or approve the apostolic succession directly, but will continue with further inquiries about the matter.

Negotiated at Järvenpää, Finland, and inaugurated with a celebration of the Eucharist at Porvoo Cathedral in 1992, the Porvoo Communion agreement of unity includes the mutual recognition of the traditional apostolic succession among the following churches:
 Lutheran churches: Evangelical Lutheran Church of Iceland, Church of Norway, Church of Sweden, Evangelical Lutheran Church of Finland, Estonian Evangelical Lutheran Church, Evangelical Lutheran Church of Lithuania, Church of Denmark, The Lutheran Church in Great Britain  observer: Evangelical Lutheran Church of Latvia.
 Anglican Communion: Church of Ireland, Scottish Episcopal Church, Church of England, the Church in Wales, the Lusitanian Catholic Apostolic Evangelical Church, and the Spanish Reformed Episcopal Church.

At least one of the Scandinavian Lutheran churches in the Porvoo Communion of churches, the Church of Denmark has bishops, but strictly speaking they were not in the historic apostolic succession prior to their entry into the Porvoo Communion, since their episcopate and holy orders derived from Johannes Bugenhagen, who was a pastor, not a bishop. In 2010, the Church of Denmark joined the Porvoo Communion of churches, after a process of mutual consecrations of bishops had led to the introduction of historic apostolic succession. The Lutheran Church in Great Britain also joined the Porvoo Agreement, in 2014.

In Scandinavia, where High Church Lutheranism and Pietist Lutheranism has been highly influential, the Evangelical Lutheran Mission Diocese of Finland, Mission Province of the Church of Sweden, and the Evangelical Lutheran Diocese of Norway entered into schism with their national churches due to "the secularization of the national/state churches in their respective countries involving matters of both Christian doctrine and ethics"; these have altar and pulpit fellowship through the Communion of Nordic Lutheran Dioceses and are members of the confessional International Lutheran Council with their bishops having lines of apostolic succession from other traditional Lutheran Churches, such as the Evangelical Lutheran Church in Kenya.

Similarly, in the High Church Lutheranism of Germany, some religious brotherhoods such as Hochkirchliche St. Johannes-Bruderschaft and Hochkirchlicher Apostolat St. Ansgar have managed to arrange for their own bishop to be re-ordained in apostolic succession. The members of these brotherhoods do not form into separate ecclesia.

The Evangelical Lutheran Church in America, North America's largest Lutheran body, gained apostolic succession through Lutheran bishops in the historic episcopate; this allowed for full communion with the Episcopal Church in 2000, upon the signing of Called to Common Mission. By this document the full communion between the Evangelical Lutheran Church in America and the Episcopal Church was established. As such, "all episcopal installations in the Evangelical Lutheran Church in America take place with the participation of bishops in the apostolic succession." The Evangelical Lutheran Church in America is headed by a presiding bishop who is elected by the churchwide assembly for a six-year term.

The Evangelical Catholic Church, a Lutheran denomination of Evangelical Catholic churchmanship based in North America, taught:

In recent years a number of Lutheran churches of the Evangelical Catholic and High Church Lutheran churchmanship in the United States of America have accepted the doctrine of apostolic succession and have successfully recovered it, generally from Independent Catholic churches. At present, most of these church bodies have memberships numbering in the hundreds.
 The Lutheran Evangelical Protestant Church (LEPC) were some of the earliest Lutherans in America. They have autonomous and congregationally oriented ministries and consecrate male and female deacons, priests and bishops in apostolic succession with the laying on of hands during celebration of Word and Sacrament. 
 The Anglo-Lutheran Catholic Church recovered the apostolic succession from Old Catholic and Independent Catholic churches, and adopted a strict episcopal polity. All of its clergy have been ordained (or re-ordained) into the historic apostolic succession. This Church was formed in 1997, with its headquarters in Kansas City, Missouri.
 The Lutheran Orthodox Church, founded in 2004 traces its historic lineage of apostolic succession through Anglican, Lutheran, and Old Catholic lines.
 The Lutheran Church - International is another North American Lutheran church which reports that it has recovered the historic apostolic succession.

Indifference to the issue
Many German Lutherans appear to demur on this issue, which may be sourced in the church governance views of Martin Luther. Luther's reform movement usually did not abrogate the ecclesiastic office of bishop.

An important historical context to explicate the wide differences among German Lutheran churches is the Prussian Union of 1817, whereby the secular government directed the Lutheran churches in Prussia to merge with non-Lutheran Reformed churches in Prussia. The Reformed churches generally oppose on principle the traditional doctrine of ecclesiastic Apostolic Succession, e.g., not usually even recognising the church office of bishop. Later in the 19th century, other Lutheran and Reformed congregations merged to form united church bodies in some of the other 39 states of the German Confederation, e.g., in Anhalt, Baden, Bremen, Hesse and Nassau, Hesse-Kassel and Waldeck, and the Palatinate. Yet the partial nature of this list also serves to show that in Germany there remained many Lutherans who never united with the Reformed.

Other Lutheran churches are indifferent as a matter of doctrine regarding this particular issue of ecclesiastical governance. In America, the conservative Lutheran Church–Missouri Synod (LCMS) places its church authority in the congregation rather than in the bishop, although its founder, C. F. W. Walther, while establishing congregational polity for the LCMS, considered polity (a church's form of government) to be a matter of adiaphora (something indifferent).

Methodist churches

In the beginnings of the Methodist movement, adherents were instructed to receive the sacraments within the Anglican Church since the Methodists were still a movement and not as yet a separate church in England until 1805. The American Methodists soon petitioned to receive the sacraments from the local preachers who conducted worship services and revivals. The Bishop of London refused to ordain Methodist priests and deacons in the British American colonies. John Wesley, the founder of the movement, was reluctant to allow unordained preachers to administer the sacraments:

Some scholars argue that in 1763, Greek Orthodox bishop Erasmus of the Diocese of Arcadia, who was visiting London at the time, consecrated John Wesley a bishop, and ordained several Methodist lay preachers as priests, including John Jones. Wesley could not openly announce his episcopal consecration without incurring the penalty of the Præmunire Act. In light of Wesley's episcopal consecration, the Methodist Church can lay a claim on apostolic succession, as understood in the traditional sense. Since John Wesley "ordained and sent forth every Methodist preacher in his day, who preached and baptized and ordained, and since every Methodist preacher who has ever been ordained as a Methodist was ordained in this direct 'succession' from Wesley, then the Methodist Church teaches that it has all the direct merits coming from apostolic succession, if any such there be." This apostolic succession is recognized by Unity Catholic Church, an independent Catholic church.

Most Methodists view apostolic succession outside its high church sense. This is because Wesley believed that the offices of bishop and presbyter constituted one order, citing an ancient opinion from the Church of Alexandria; Jerome, a Church Father, wrote: "For even at Alexandria from the time of Mark the Evangelist until the episcopates of Heraclas and Dionysius the presbyters always named as bishop one of their own number chosen by themselves and set in a more exalted position, just as an army elects a general, or as deacons appoint one of themselves whom they know to be diligent and call him archdeacon. For what function, excepting ordination, belongs to a bishop that does not also belong to a presbyter?" (Letter CXLVI). John Wesley thus argued that for two centuries the succession of bishops in the Church of Alexandria, which was founded by Mark the Evangelist, was preserved through ordination by presbyters alone and was considered valid by that ancient Church.

Since the Bishop of London refused to ordain ministers in the British American colonies, this constituted an emergency and as a result, on 2 September 1784, Wesley, along with a priest from the Anglican Church and two other elders, operating under the ancient Alexandrian habitude, ordained Thomas Coke a superintendent, although Coke embraced the title bishop.

Today, the United Methodist Church follows this ancient Alexandrian practice as bishops are elected from the presbyterate: the Discipline of the Methodist Church, in ¶303, affirms that "ordination to this ministry is a gift from God to the Church. In ordination, the Church affirms and continues the apostolic ministry through persons empowered by the Holy Spirit." It also uses sacred scripture in support of this practice, namely, 1 Timothy 4:14, which states: 
The Methodist Church also buttresses this argument with the leg of sacred tradition of the Wesleyan Quadrilateral by citing the Church Fathers, many of whom concur with this view.

In addition to the aforementioned arguments – or perhaps instead of them – in 1937 the annual Conference of the British Methodist Church located the "true continuity" with the Church of past ages in "the continuity of Christian experience, the fellowship in the gift of the one Spirit; in the continuity in the allegiance to one Lord, the continued proclamation of the message; the continued acceptance of the mission;..." [through a long chain which goes back to] "the first disciples in the company of the Lord Himself ... This is our doctrine of apostolic succession" [which neither depends on, nor is secured by,] "an official succession of ministers, whether bishops or presbyters, from apostolic times, but rather by fidelity to apostolic truth".

The Church of North India, Church of Pakistan and Church of South India are members of the World Methodist Council and the clergy of these three united Protestant churches possess lines of apostolic succession, according to the Anglican understanding of this doctrine, through the Church of India, Burma and Ceylon (CIBC), which finished merging with these three in the 1970s.

In June 2014, the Church of Ireland, a province of the Anglican Communion, extended its lines of apostolic succession into the Methodist Church in Ireland, as "the Archbishop of Dublin and Bishop of Down and Dromore took part in the installation of the new President of the Methodist Church of Ireland, the Rev. Peter Murray." In May 2014, the "Church of Ireland’s General Synod approved an agreement signed with the Methodist Church that provided for the interchangeability of clergy, allowing an ordained minister of either church to come under the discipline and oversight of the other."

Hussite Church and Moravian Church
The Moravian Church, as with the Hussite Church, teaches the doctrine of apostolic succession. The Moravian Church claims apostolic succession as a legacy of the old Unity of the Brethren. In order to preserve the succession, three Bohemian Brethren were consecrated bishops by Bishop Stephen of Austria, a Waldensian bishop who had been ordained by a Roman Catholic bishop in 1434. These three consecrated bishops returned to Litice in Bohemia and then ordained other brothers, thereby preserving the historic episcopate.

Presbyterian/Reformed churches
Jus Divinum Regiminis Ecclesiastici (English translation: The Divine Right of Church Government), which was promulgated by Presbyterian clergy in 1646, holds that historic ministerial succession is necessary for legitimate ministerial authority. It states that ministerial succession is conferred by elders through the laying on of hands, in accordance with Timothy 4:14. The Westminster Assembly held that "There is one general church visible" and that "every minister of the word is to be ordained by imposition of hands, and prayer, with fasting, by those preaching presbyters to whom it doth belong".

The Church of North India, Church of Pakistan and Church of South India are members of the World Alliance of Reformed Churches and the clergy of these three united Protestant churches possess lines of apostolic succession, according to the Anglican understanding of this doctrine, through the Church of India, Burma and Ceylon (CIBC), which finished merging with these three in the 1970s.

Pentecostal churches
On 6 February 2003, Rt. the Rev. Dr. K. J. Samuel, the Moderator Bishop of the Church of South India (a part of the worldwide Anglican Communion), along with the Rt. Rev. P.M. Dhotekar, Bishop of Nagpur of the Church of North India, and the Rt. Rev. Bancha Nidhi Nayak, Bishop of Phulbani of the Church of North India, consecrated Pentecostal minister K. P. Yohannan as a bishop in Anglican lines of apostolic succession; the Rt. Rev. K.P. Yohannan thereafter became the first Metropolitan of the Believers Eastern Church, a Pentecostal denomination which acquired an episcopal polity of ecclesiastical governance.

Many other Pentecostal Christians teach that "the sole guarantor of apostolic faith, which includes apostolic life, is the Holy Spirit." In addressing the Church of God General Assembly, Ambrose Jessup Tomlinson stated that "Although we do not claim a line of succession from the holy apostles, we do believe we are following in their example."

Latter Day Saint movement

Denominations within the Latter Day Saint movement preach the necessity of apostolic succession and claim it through the process of restoration. According to their teaching, a period of universal apostasy followed the death of the Twelve Apostles. Without apostles or prophets left on the earth with the legitimate Priesthood Authority, many of the true teachings and practices of Christianity were lost. Eventually these were restored to the prophet Joseph Smith and various others in a series of divine conferrals and ordinations by angelic men who had held this authority during their lifetimes (see this partial list of restoration events). As it relates to apostolic succession, Joseph Smith and Oliver Cowdery said that the apostles Peter, James, and John appeared to them in 1829 and conferred upon them the Melchizedek Priesthood and with it "the keys of the kingdom, and of the dispensation of the fullness of times".

For the Church of Jesus Christ of Latter-day Saints (LDS Church), the largest denomination in the Latter-day Saint movement, Apostolic Succession involves the leadership of the church being established through the Quorum of the Twelve Apostles. Each time the President of the Church dies, the most senior apostle, who is designated as the President of the Quorum of the Twelve Apostles, is set apart as the new church president.

Denominations that reject apostolic succession
Some Nonconformist Protestants, particularly those in the Calvinist tradition, deny the doctrine of apostolic succession, believing that it is neither taught in Scripture nor necessary for Christian teaching, life, and practice. Accordingly, these Protestants strip the notion of apostolic succession from the definition of "apostolic" or "apostolicity". For them, to be apostolic is simply to be in submission to the teachings of the original twelve apostles as recorded in Scripture. This doctrinal stance reflects the Protestant view of authority, embodied in the doctrine known as Sola Scriptura.

Among the first who rejected the doctrine of apostolic succession were John Calvin, and Martin Luther. They both said that the episcopacy was inadequate to address corruption, doctrinal or otherwise, and that this inadequacy justified the intervention of the church of common people. In part this position was also necessary, as otherwise there would have been no means to elicit or initiate reform of the church.

In the 20th century, there has been more contact between Protestants and Christians from Eastern traditions which claim apostolic succession for their ministry. Like the Roman Catholic Church, these ancient Eastern churches may use the doctrine of apostolic succession in ministry in their apologetics against some forms of Protestantism. Some Protestants feel that such claims of apostolic succession are proven false by the differences in traditions and doctrines between these churches: Roman Catholics and Eastern Orthodox consider both the Church of the East and the Oriental Orthodox churches to be heretical, having been anathematized in the early ecumenical councils of Ephesus (431) and Chalcedon (451) respectively. Churches that claim apostolic succession in ministry distinguish this from doctrinal orthodoxy, holding that "it is possible to have valid orders coming down from the apostles, and yet not to have a continuous spiritual history coming down from the apostles".

All Christians who have a genuine relationship with God through and in Christ are part of the "true Church", according to exemplary statements of evangelical Protestant theology, notwithstanding condemnation of the Catholic Church by some Protestants. According to these statements, claims that one or more denominations might be the "true Church" are nothing more than propaganda which has evolved over centuries to support authoritarian claims – based on tradition or based on scripture – of merely human institutions. Such claims can be found among the worldwide community of Christians. Yet all appear to treasure the truth that liberates, and Jesus taught his followers to love one another.

See also
 Baptist successionism
 Episcopi vagantes
 List of bishops
 New Apostolic Church
 Pope Linus
 Valid but illicit

References

Further reading

External links 
 Against Heresies, Online-text, Irenaeus, Against Heresies
 Apostolicity in the Catholic Encyclopedia
 Discussion of the Papacy by Scott Hahn
 "Was Wesley Ordained By Bishop Erasmus?" The Methodist Quarterly Review (1878)
 Methodist/Anglican Thoughts On Apostolic Succession by The Reverend Dr. Gregory S. Neal

Christian terminology
Ecclesiology
Episcopacy in Anglicanism
Episcopacy in the Catholic Church
Episcopacy in Eastern Orthodoxy
Succession